Chranibory Drugie  is a settlement in the administrative district of Gmina Boćki, within Bielsk County, Podlaskie Voivodeship, in north-eastern Poland.

References

Chranibory Drugie